SXL Live in Japan is a live performance album by world music and jazz fusion ensemble SXL, released in 1987 by CBS/Sony Japan. For the first half of the album, the group performs separately from one another. Musicians Aïyb Dieng, Ronald Shannon Jackson, Bill Laswell and L. Shankar perform on "Arambam", a variation on the processional pattern on SamulNori's debut piece "Uttari kut". "Clouds, Wind, Rain, Thunder and Lightning" was played by SamulNori and included an extended sequence taken from their piece "Samdo nongak".

Track listing

Personnel 
SXL
Aïyb Dieng – percussion
Ronald Shannon Jackson – drums
Bill Laswell – bass guitar
SamulNori – percussion
L. Shankar – violin, voice

Technical
SXL – producer
Tom Suzuki – producer, mixing

Release history

References

External links 
 
 SXL Live in Japan at Bandcamp

1987 live albums
SXL (band) albums